Elisabeth Osterwalder is a Swiss Para-alpine skier and athlete. She represented Switzerland at the 1984 Paralympic Winter Games. She won a total of seven medals.

Career 
She competed at the 1976 Winter Paralympics, in Örnsköldsvik, in giant slalom IV A winning a gold medal, with a time of 3:02:07.

She competed at the 1980 Winter Paralympics in Geilo, winning gold medals in  giant slalom 2B - in 3:39:11, and slalom 2B - in 2:07:16.

She competed at the 1984 Winter Paralympics, in Innsbruck , winning a silver medal in the LW4 super combined race (in 7'08" 33  ), and finishing fourth in Women's downhill LW4.

Osterwalder also competed in the Paralympic athletics competitions at the 1980 Summer Paralympics in Arnhem  winning a gold medal in the shot put C1 (with the measure of 6.01 m), a silver medal in the throw of the C1 javelin (result 14.94 m), and a bronze in the  C1 discus (a throw of 14.02 m  ).

References 

Living people
Paralympic athletes of Switzerland
Paralympic alpine skiers of Switzerland
Swiss female alpine skiers
Swiss female javelin throwers
Swiss female discus throwers
Swiss female shot putters
Paralympic gold medalists for Switzerland
Paralympic silver medalists for Switzerland
Paralympic bronze medalists for Switzerland
Alpine skiers at the 1976 Winter Paralympics
Alpine skiers at the 1980 Winter Paralympics
Alpine skiers at the 1984 Winter Paralympics
Athletes (track and field) at the 1980 Summer Paralympics
Medalists at the 1976 Winter Paralympics
Medalists at the 1980 Winter Paralympics
Medalists at the 1980 Summer Paralympics
Medalists at the 1984 Winter Paralympics
Year of birth missing (living people)